Helmuth von Pannwitz (14 October 1898 – 16 January 1947) was a German general who was a cavalry officer during the First and the Second World Wars. Later he became a Lieutenant General of the Wehrmacht, a SS-Obergruppenführer of the Waffen-SS, and Feldataman of the XV SS Cossack Cavalry Corps. In 1947 he was tried for war crimes under Ukaz 43 by the Military Collegium of the Supreme Court of the Soviet Union, sentenced to death on 16 January 1947 and executed in Lefortovo Prison the same day. He was rehabilitated by a military prosecutor in Moscow in April 1996. In June 2001, however, the reversal of the conviction of Pannwitz was overturned and his conviction was reinstated.

Early life
Pannwitz was born into a family of Prussian nobility on his father's estate Botzanowitz (today Bodzanowice), Silesia, near Rosenberg (today Olesno), now part of Poland but directly on the German-Russian border of that time. His family was originally from the village of Pannwitz in Lusatia. From the 14th to 16th century the family held the office of Burggraf of Glatz.

Aged twelve, he entered the Prussian cadet school in Wahlstatt, near Liegnitz in Silesia, and later the main cadet school at Lichterfelde. Even before outbreak of World War I he was attracted by exhibitions of Cossack units that were organized in the neighboring towns of the Russian Empire.

As an officer cadet, Pannwitz upon the outbreak of the First World War joined the Imperial German Army as a volunteer (1st Regiment of Lancers, based at Militsch), in the course of which he was at the age of sixteen promoted to the rank of Leutnant (second lieutenant/cornet) and decorated with the Iron Cross Second Class in the same year (and, a year later, the First Class) for bravery in action. Immediately after the war he fought in the ranks of the Volunteer Corps (Freikorps) against Polish separatists in Silesia and participated in the Kapp Putsch. Wanted as a suspect in the murder of a Social-Democrat, Bernhard Schottländer, in Breslau, he fled to Poland. Under an assumed name, Pannwitz became a leader in the Black Reichswehr in 1923 where he was involved in a number of Feme murders. In the aftermath of the failed Küstrin Putsch, Pannwitz fled again to Poland. After spending a year in Hungary, Pannwitz went to Poland in 1926, where he lived and worked as an administrator of farms, at the last in charge of the estates of Princess Radziwill in Młochów, near Warsaw.

When an amnesty was granted in 1931, Pannwitz returned to Germany. He became a Stabsführer of the SA in Silesia. In 1934 he commanded an SA cavalry squadron. By cooperating with the Gestapo he played a leading role during the Röhm purge in Silesia. For that he was admitted to join the Nazi Party. In 1935 he rejoined the German Army as a Rittmeister (captain) and cavalry squadron commander in the 2nd Cavalry Regiment in Angerburg, East Prussia. In 1938, following the Anschluss when Austria became part of Germany, he was transferred to Austria and became detachment commander with the 11th Cavalry Regiment at Stockerau near Vienna, being promoted to the rank of Major at the same time. World War II found him as the commander of the reconnaissance detachment of the 45th Infantry Division in Poland and France.

World War II
On active service again in World War II, Pannwitz was awarded "bars" to his previous decorations and in September 1941 was awarded the Knight's Cross of the Iron Cross. He received the Oak Leaves as an Oberst (colonel) a year later for successful military leadership, when he was in command of a battle group covering the southern flank in the battle of Stalingrad.

Pannwitz was instrumental in establishing a Cossack force, Cossack Cavalry Brigade, which was formed on 21 April 1943. The unit conducted anti-partisan operations in Ukraine and Belarus, and was then moved to fight against Yugoslav partisans. During punitive operations in Serbia and Croatia, the Cossack regiments under Pannwitz's command committed a number of atrocities against the civilian population including several mass rapes and routine summary executions. Even for von Pannwitz these atrocities exceeded what he perceived as normal. Moreover, in his eyes they threatened discipline and military success. Therefore he issued an order dated 20 October 1943, according to which crimes of that kind would result in the death penalty.

At the award ceremony in Berlin, when Pannwitz received the "Oak Leaves" for his Knight's Cross on 15 January 1943, he told Hitler that the official Nazi policies which caused Slavs to be regarded as subhumans (Untermenschen) for strategical reasons were totally wrong.

During the summer of 1944 the two brigades were upgraded to become the 1st Cossack Division and 2nd Cossack Cavalry Division. On 25 February 1945 these divisions were combined to become XV SS Cossack Cavalry Corps.

Because of the respect he showed for his troops and his tendency to attend Russian Orthodox services with them, Pannwitz was very popular with his Cossack troops. Before the end of the war, he was elected Feldataman (German rendering of Supreme Ataman, the highest rank in the Cossack hierarchy and one that was traditionally reserved for the Tsar alone).

By the end of the war, the SS took control of all foreign units within the German forces. The Himmler file in the Imperial War Museum contains a record of a conversation which occurred on 26 August 1944 between Himmler, General von Pannwitz, and his Chief of Staff, Colonel H.-J. von Schultz. An agreement was reached that the Cossack division, soon to be the Cossack Corps, was placed under SS administration in terms of replacements and supplies. Both the German cadre and the Cossack troops were to retain their uniforms and their Wehrmacht or Cossack ranks. For the moment Pannwitz refused to enter the SS, arguing: “I have been in the army since I was fifteen. To leave it now would seem to me like desertion.” Himmler sought to place all Cossack fighting units under von Pannwitz's command. Thus in November 1944 most units were transferred to the Waffen-SS and integrated into the newly formed XV SS Cossack Cavalry Corps. By his own request von Pannwitz was discharged from the army on 10 February 1945 and entered the SS in the rank of SS-Obergruppenführer and lieutenant-general of the Waffen-SS the following day.

Aftermath
Pannwitz surrendered on 11 May 1945 to British forces (Eighth Army`s V Corps) near Völkermarkt in Carinthia, Austria, and tried to ensure that his men would remain in the custody of the Western Allies. By mid-May, however, it was obvious that the Cossacks would be handed over to the Soviet Union.

Pannwitz was a German national, and under the provisions of the Yalta Conference not subject to repatriation to the Soviet Union. But on 26 May he was deprived of his command and placed under arrest while the forcible loading of the Cossacks into trucks began and continued through the following days. Although many escaped from their camps following these actions, General v. Pannwitz and many of his German officers shared the uncertain fate of the Cossacks, so these Germans surrendered with the Cossacks to Soviet authorities at Judenburg.

Execution

Pannwitz was executed in Moscow on 16 January 1947, having been convicted by a military tribunal of war crimes in the Soviet Union.

Attempted rehabilitation
Almost fifty years later, on 23 April 1996, during the Russian presidency of Boris Yeltsin, members of the Pannwitz family petitioned for a posthumous reversal of the 1946 conviction. The Military High Prosecutor in Moscow subsequently determined that Pannwitz was eligible for rehabilitation as a victim of Stalin-era repression. On 28 June 2001, however, rehabilitation was reversed in a ruling that disputed jurisdiction of the 1996 proceedings, and Pannwitz's conviction for military crimes was reinstated.

Awards and decorations
 Iron Cross (1914)
 2nd Class (16 September 1915)
 1st Class (27 January 1917)
 Wound Badge (1914)
 in Black
 Cross of Honor (20 December 1934)
 Wehrmacht-Dienstauszeichnung
 Clasp to the Iron Cross (1939)
 2nd Class (23 September 1939)
 1st Class (5 October 1939)
 General Assault Badge (18 July 1941)
 Eastern Front Medal
 Order of Michael the Brave
 3rd Class (7 May 1943)
 Order of the Crown of King Zvonimir with Stars and Swords
 Knight's Cross of the Iron Cross with Oak Leaves
 Knight's Cross (467th) on 4 September 1941 as Oberstleutnant and commander of Aufklärungs-Abteilung 45
 167th Oak Leaves on 23 December 1942 as Oberst and leader of the Kampfgruppe "von Pannwitz"

See also
 Pyotr Krasnov
 Andrei Shkuro
 Repatriation of Cossacks after World War II

References

Citations

Bibliography

Further reading

1898 births
1947 deaths
People from Olesno
German untitled nobility
20th-century Freikorps personnel
Lieutenant generals of the German Army (Wehrmacht)
German Army personnel of World War I
Prussian Army personnel
Recipients of the Knight's Cross of the Iron Cross with Oak Leaves
Recipients of the clasp to the Iron Cross, 1st class
People from the Province of Silesia
Recipients of the Order of the Crown of King Zvonimir
Recipients of the Order of Michael the Brave
Executed people from Opole Voivodeship
Nazis executed by the Soviet Union by hanging
People executed for war crimes
SS-Obergruppenführer
Waffen-SS personnel